"Goodbye Stranger" is a song by the English rock band Supertramp; it was written by Rick Davies. The song first appeared on their sixth studio album, Breakfast in America (1979).  The lyrics present an "optimistic view from a drifter."

Reception
Billboard described "Goodbye Stranger" as "a fluid midtempo number highlighted by the band's near falsetto vocals, dominant keyboards and a strong melody line."  Cash Box said it has "intriguing, well-paced vocals" from Rick Davies, and the "high backup singing" from Roger Hodgson and "blithe, spirited instrumentation."  Record World said that the "keyboard/guitar & chorus hook provide a blithe fairytale effect."

Ultimate Classic Rock critic Nick DeRiso rated it as Supertramp's 4th best song, calling it a "snarky kiss-off from Davies" that "showcases the band's predilection for the Wurlitzer."  Brett Milano of UDiscover Music rated Roger Hodgson's guitar solo at the end of the song as one of the 100 all-time greatest.   Gary Graff of Billboard rated "Goodbye Stranger" as Supertramp's 9th best song, saying it's "one of the best executed trade-offs between Davies and Hodgson vocals" and has one of Supertramp's "hottest guitar solos."

Personnel 
 Rick Davies – Wurlitzer electronic piano, Hammond organ, lead and backing vocals
 Roger Hodgson – electric guitar, backing vocals, lead vocal on chorus
 John Helliwell – backing vocals, whistling
 Bob Siebenberg – drums
 Dougie Thomson – bass guitar

Charts and certifications

Charts
Despite being met with only limited success in the UK, it was a major hit elsewhere, even a Top 20 hit in the United States and Canada, reaching number 15 and 6 respectively.

Weekly charts

Year-end charts

Certifications

In popular culture
The song plays in many films and television programs. In the episode "Goodbye, Toby" of The Office, Michael Scott sings a parody of "Goodbye Stranger" entitled "Goodbye, Toby". In the episode "Goodbye Stranger" in the eighth season of Supernatural, the song plays on the Impala's radio after the angel Castiel disappears. The song plays in the trailer of the 2023 film Beau Is Afraid. It is also played in the film Magnolia.

References 

Supertramp songs
1978 songs
1979 singles
Songs written by Rick Davies
Music videos directed by Bruce Gowers
A&M Records singles